Hwachae is a general term for traditional Korean punches, made with various fruits or edible flower petals. The fruits and flowers are soaked in honeyed water or honeyed magnolia berry juice. In modern South Korea, carbonated drinks and/or fruit juices are also commonly added to hwachae. Hwachae is often garnished with pine nuts before it is served.

Types 
 
It is said that there are around thirty types of traditional hwachae.

Fruit 

 Aengdu-hwachae ("cherry punch") – made with Korean cherries and honeyed water. It is associated with Dano, the fifth day of the fifth lunar month.
 Bae-hwachae ("pear punch") – made with flower-shaped pieces of Korean pear and honeyed magnolia berry juice.
 Boksunga-hwachae ("peach punch") – made with peach preserved in honey and sugared water.
 Chamoe-hwachae ("melon punch") – made with Korean melon slices, cherries, celery slices, and honeyed magnolia berry juice.
 Cheondoboksunga-hwachae ("nectarine punch") – made with nectarine preserved in honey and sugared water. 
 Milgam-hwachae ("citrus punch") – also called gyul-hwachae; made with citrus fruit—usually summer orange— pieces, in the fruit's juice mixed with lemon juice, sugar, and water. It is a local specialty of Jeju Island, where summer oranges and most other citrus fruits are cultivated.
 Mogwa-hwachae ("quince punch") – made with Chinese quince slices preserved with hardy mandarin slices in sugar and honeyed water, consumed after 20 days.
 Omija-hwachae ("magnolia berry punch") – made with honeyed magnolia berry juice and decorative slices of Korean pear. 
 Podo-hwachae ("grape punch") – made with peeled grape boiled in sugared water, cherries, and honeyed water.
 Sagwa-hwachae ("apple punch") – made with flower-shaped pieces of apple and honeyed magnolia berry juice. 
 Sansa-hwachae ("hawthorn punch") – made with jellied mountain hawthorn, called sansa-pyeon, sliced and floated in honeyed water.
 Sanddalgi-hwachae ("raspberry punch") – made with Korean raspberries and honeyed water. It is associated with Yudu, the fifteenth day of the sixth lunar month. 
 Subak-hwachae ("watermelon punch") – made with scooped or sliced watermelon pieces, bits of other fruits, ice cubes, and honeyed watermelon juice. It is a popular summertime refreshment.
 Ddalgi-hwachae ("strawberry punch") – made with strawberries.
 Yuja-hwachae ("yuja punch") – made with yuja and Korean pear, both thinly julienned, and pomegranate and honeyed water.

Flower 
Flower petals are coated with mung bean starch and blanched, cooled in ice water, and drained before being put in hwachae. Flower hwachae is usually topped with pine nuts.
 Jangmi-hwachae ("rose punch") – made with rose petals and honeyed magnolia berry juice. 
 Jindallae-hwachae ("rhododendron punch") – made with Korean rhododendron petals and honeyed magnolia berry juice. It is associated with Samjinnal, the third day of the third lunar month.
 Songhwa-hwachae ("pine pollen punch") – also called songhwa-su or songhwa-milsu; made with dried pollen of Korean red pine and honeyed water. It is a local specialty of Gangwon Province.
 Sunchae-hwachae ("water-shield punch") – made with water-shield leaves and honeyed water or honeyed magnolia berry juice.

Noodle 
 Changmyeon ("noodle punch") – cool dessert for summer, consisting of noodles made with mung bean starch and omija juice.
 Hwamyeon ("flower noodle punch") – cool noodle soup almost similar to changmyeon except the addition of edible flower petals.

See also 

 Baesuk – boiled pear punch
 Sikhye – rice punch
 Songhwa-milsu — traditional drink made of pine flower pollen (songhwa) and honey.
 Sudan – grain cake punch
 Sujeonggwa – cinnamon punch

References 

 
Flower dishes
Fruit dishes
Korean drinks
Mixed drinks
Non-alcoholic drinks